Blendon Township may refer to:
 Blendon Township, Michigan
 Blendon Township, Franklin County, Ohio

Township name disambiguation pages